Yevgeniya Nyukhalova (born ) is a Ukrainian female volleyball player.

With her club Voléro Zürich she competed at the 2015 FIVB Volleyball Women's Club World Championship.

She played for Thompson Rivers University.

Clubs

References

External links
 profile at FIVB.org
 profile at CEV

1995 births
Living people
Ukrainian expatriate sportspeople in Switzerland
Ukrainian women's volleyball players
Expatriate volleyball players in Switzerland
Ukrainian expatriate sportspeople in France
Ukrainian expatriate sportspeople in the Philippines
Expatriate volleyball players in France
Ukrainian expatriate sportspeople in Finland
Expatriate volleyball players in Finland
Ukrainian expatriate sportspeople in Canada
Place of birth missing (living people)
Expatriate volleyball players in the Philippines
Expatriate volleyball players in Canada